The Samsung GT-I7500 Galaxy is a smartphone manufactured by Samsung that uses the open source Android operating system. It was announced on 27 April 2009 and was released on 29 June 2009 as the first Android-powered device from Samsung Mobile, and the first in what would become the long-running Galaxy series. It is succeeded by the Samsung Galaxy S.

Features 
The Galaxy is a smartphone, offering quad-band GSM and announced with tri-band HSDPA (900/1700/2100) at 7.2Mbit/s (however, Samsung's official pages for the Danish, Finnish, Norwegian and Swedish versions only mention dual-band UMTS 900/2100). The phone features a 3.2-inch AMOLED capacitive touchscreen, a 5 megapixel autofocus camera with power LED flash, and a digital compass. Unlike the first Android phone, the HTC Dream (known as the T-Mobile G1 in the USA), the i7500 has a standard 3.5 mm headphone jack, and a Directional Pad in place of a trackball.

Software-wise, the Galaxy offers a suite of Mobile Google services, including Google Search, Gmail, YouTube, Google Calendar, and Google Talk. The phone's GPS enables Google Maps features such as My Location, and Google Latitude. It also supports MP3, AAC (including iTunes Plus downloads) (only the codec, not the .aac format), and H.264 video. A beta version of the Spotify music streaming service is also now available for this phone via the Android Marketplace.

Criticism 
Due to a lack of firmware updates, Samsung received criticism from original Galaxy users.

For some countries, Samsung updated the Galaxy's firmware to Donut (1.6). Users from other countries could download and update manually, at the risk of voiding the warranty.

See also 
Samsung i8000 Omnia II, Samsung's Windows Mobile flagship at the time
Samsung i8910 Omnia HD, Samsung's Symbian flagship phone at the time
Samsung S8000 Jet, Samsung's mid-range proprietary phone at the time

References

External links 
 Samsung Mobile homepage
 Official press release
 Samsung Galaxy I7500 Owners Group 

Galaxy (Original)
Android (operating system) devices
Mobile Linux
Portable media players
Mobile phones introduced in 2009
Samsung smartphones